The freguesias (civil parishes) of Portugal are listed in by municipality according to the following format:
 concelho
 freguesias

Baião
Ancede
Baião (Santa Leocádia)
Campelo
Frende
Gestaçô
Gove
Grilo
Loivos da Ribeira
Loivos do Monte
Mesquinhata
Ovil
Ribadouro
Santa Cruz do Douro
Santa Marinha do Zêzere
São Tomé de Covelas
Teixeira
Teixeiró
Tresouras
Valadares
Viariz

Barcelos
Abade de Neiva
Aborim
Adães
Aguiar
Airó
Aldreu
Alheira
Alvelos
Alvito (São Martinho)
Alvito (São Pedro)
Arcozelo
Areias
Areias de Vilar
Balugães
Barcelinhos
Barcelos
Barqueiros
Bastuço (Santo Estêvão)
Bastuço (São João)
Cambeses
Campo
Carapeços
Carreira
Carvalhal (Barcelos)
Carvalhos
Chavão
Chorente
Cossourado
Courel
Couto
Creixomil
Cristelo
Durrães
Encourados
Faria
Feitos
Fonte Coberta
Fornelos
Fragoso
Galegos (Santa Maria)
Galegos (São Martinho)
Gamil
Gilmonde
Góios
Grimancelos
Gueral
Igreja Nova
Lama
Lijó
Macieira de Rates
Manhente
Mariz
Martim
Midões
Milhazes
Minhotães
Monte de Fralães
Moure
Negreiros
Oliveira
Palme
Panque
Paradela
Pedra Furada (Chorente, Góios, Courel, Pedra Furada e Gueral)
Pereira
Perelhal
Pousa
Quintiães
Remelhe
Rio Covo (Santa Eugénia)
Rio Covo (Santa Eulália)
Roriz
Sequeade
Silva
Silveiros
Tamel (Santa Leocádia)
Tamel (São Pedro Fins)
Tamel (São Veríssimo)
Tregosa
Ucha
Várzea
Viatodos
Vila Boa
Vila Cova
Vila Frescainha (São Martinho)
Vila Frescainha (São Pedro)
Vila Seca
Vilar de Figos
Vilar do Monte

Barrancos
Barrancos

Barreiro
Alto do Seixalinho
Barreiro
Coina
Lavradio
Palhais
Santo André
Santo António da Charneca
Verderena

Batalha
Batalha
Golpilheira
Reguengo do Fetal
São Mamede

Beja
Albernoa
Baleizão
Beja (Salvador)
Beja (Santa Maria da Feira)
Beja (Santiago Maior)
Beja (São João Baptista)
Beringel
Cabeça Gorda
Mombeja
Nossa Senhora das Neves
Quintos
Salvada
Santa Clara de Louredo
Santa Vitória
São Brissos
São Matias
Trigaches
Trindade

Belmonte
Belmonte
Caria
Colmeal da Torre
Inguias
Maçainhas

Benavente
Barrosa
Benavente
Samora Correia
Santo Estêvão

Bombarral
Bombarral
Carvalhal
Pó
Roliça
Vale Covo

Borba
Borba (Matriz)
Borba (São Bartolomeu)
Orada
Rio de Moinhos

Boticas
Alturas do Barroso
Ardãos
Beça
Bobadela
Boticas
Cerdedo
Codessoso
Covas do Barroso
Curros
Dornelas
Fiães do Tâmega
Granja
Pinho
São Salvador de Viveiro
Sapiãos
Vilar

Braga
Adaúfe
Arcos
Arentim
Aveleda
Braga (Cividade)
Braga (Maximinos)
Braga (São João do Souto)
Braga (São José de São Lázaro)
Braga (São Vicente)
Braga (São Vítor)
Braga (Sé)
Cabreiros
Celeirós
Crespos
Cunha
Dume
Escudeiros
Espinho
Esporões
Este (São Mamede)
Este (São Pedro)
Ferreiros
Figueiredo
Fradelos
Fraião
Frossos
Gondizalves
Gualtar
Guisande
Lamaçães
Lamas
Lomar
Merelim (São Paio)
Merelim (São Pedro)
Mire de Tibães
Morreira
Navarra
Nogueira
Nogueiró
Oliveira (São Pedro)
Padim da Graça
Palmeira
Panoias
Parada de Tibães
Passos (São Julião)
Pedralva
Penso (Santo Estêvão)
Penso (São Vicente)
Pousada
Priscos
Real
Ruilhe
Santa Lucrécia de Algeriz
Semelhe
Sequeira
Sobreposta
Tadim
Tebosa
Tenões
Trandeiras
Vilaça
Vimieiro

Bragança
Alfaião
Aveleda
Babe
Baçal
Santa Maria
Sé
Calvelhe
Carragosa
Carrazedo
Castrelos
Castro de Avelãs
Coelhoso
Deilão
Donai
Espinhosela
Failde
França
Gimonde
Gondesende
Gostei
Grijó de Parada
Izeda
Macedo do Mato
Meixedo
Milhão
Mós
Nogueira
Outeiro
Parada
Paradinha Nova
Parâmio
Pinela
Pombares
Quintanilha
Quintela de Lampaças
Rabal
Rebordainhos
Rebordãos
Rio de Onor
Rio Frio
Salsas
Samil
Santa Comba de Rossas
São Julião de Palácios
São Pedro de Sarracenos
Sendas
Serapicos
Sortes
Zoio

B